Khwazakhela is a town and an administrative subdivision (Tehsil) of Swat District in the Khyber Pakhtunkhwa province of Pakistan.

Khwazakhela town (Tehsil) has 16 villages called the Azikhel. People of Azikhel are from sect of Yousafzai Dynasty. The famous Pakhtoon tribes living in Khwazakhela are Saidan,Khadikhels, Umaikhels, Zareefkhels, Barakhels and Gujjar. 

Khwazakhela is famous for the graveyards of Awliya (Saints). Some of which are Mian Baba, Derai Baba, Chinar Baba and Byne Baba. Mian Baba and Byne baba were famous warriors of Syed Dynasty and Chinar Baba was from Shamakhel Dynasty.

Khwazakhela also has the privilege of being at centre of Swat. It has its North-Eastern border with Shangla valley which is a major trade route for the people of Shangla. On the Northern aspect, It shares its border with Behrain Tehsil. The Southern border lies in association with Charbagh Tehsil; The Western along the bank of river swat.

History

Mahmud Ghaznavi, on his way to Hindustan, crossed Khwazakhela many times. He built a mosque which still exists even today by the name of Lwar-e-Jamat. In this mosque there is a ground water well dug in stone.

Climate
With a mild and generally warm and temperate climate, Khwazakhela features a humid subtropical climate (Cfa) under the Köppen climate classification. The average temperature in Khwazakhela is 18.1 °C, while the annual precipitation averages 969 mm. Even in the driest months, there is a lot of precipitation. November is the driest month with 24 mm of precipitation, while July, the wettest month, has an average precipitation of 138 mm.

July is the warmest month of the year with an average temperature of 28.1 °C. The coldest month January has an average temperature of 6.4 °C.

Administrative units
According to Khyber Pakhtunkhwa Local Government Act 2013, Tehsil Khwazakhela has following 7 Wards:

 Khawazakhela
 Shalpin
 Shin
 Kotanai
 Miandam
 Fatehpur
 Jano

References

External links
Khyber-Pakhtunkhwa Government website section on Lower Dir and neighboring places
United Nations
Hajj 2014 Uploads
 PBS paiman.jsi.com

Swat District
Tehsils of Swat District
Populated places in Swat District
Union councils of Khyber Pakhtunkhwa
Union Councils of Swat District